is a Japanese storyboard artist and director.

He is amongst J.C.Staff's most noted directors, having directed the highly rated Honey and Clover series. Beginning his career as a production manager, using his name in kanji, he moved on to direction with J.C.Staff. With 2002's Wagamama: Fairy Mirumo De Pon!, he began using his name in katakana.

Filmography

Director
Kuru Kuru Amī (2001)
Wagamama Fairy: Mirumo De Pon! (2002–2005)
Wagamama Fairy: Mirumo De Pon! Gōruden (2003)
Major (2004–2006) – first and second seasons
Honey and Clover (2005)
Nodame Cantabile (2007) – first season
Kimikiss: Pure Rouge (2007–2008)
Sweet Blue Flowers (2009)
Bakuman (2010–2013)
Chōyaku Hyakunin isshu: Uta Koi (2012)
Love Stage!! (2014)
Wolf Girl and Black Prince (2014)
Amanchu! (2016)
The Thousand Musketeers (2018)
To Me, The One Who Loved You (2022)

Other
Cooking Papa (1992–1995) – production manager
Bishōjo Senshi Sailor Moon Sailor Stars (1992–1997) – assistant director
Mama Loves the Poyopoyo-Saurus (1995–1996) – assistant director and episode director 
Bakusō Kyōdai Let's & Go!! (1996–1998) – storyboards and episode director
Cutie Honey F (1997–1998) – assistant director
Anime Ganbare Goemon (1997–1998) – storyboards and episode director
Ginga Hyōryū Vifam 13 (1998) – episode director
Neo Ranga (1998–1999) – storyboards and episode director
Kareshi Kanojo no Jijō (1998–1999) – storyboards and episode director
Soreyuke! Uchū Senkan Yamamoto Yōko (1999) – episode director
Ah! My Goddess: Being Small is Convenient (1999) – episode director
Gokudō-kun Man'yūki (1999) – storyboards and episode director
Majutsushi Orphen Revenge (1999–2000) – storyboards and episode director
Jibaku-kun (1999–2000) – opening and ending theme director
Daa! Daa! Daa! (2000–2002) – storyboards and episode director
Toradora! (2008–2009) – storyboards and episode director

References

External links
 
 Kenichi Kasai anime works at Media Arts Database 

Anime directors
People from Gifu Prefecture
1970 births
Living people